Adrian Charles Thorpe  (born  in Cambridge) is a British retired ambassador.

Thorpe was educated at The Leys School, Cambridge, and Christ's College, Cambridge, and entered the diplomatic service in 1965. He was the British Ambassador to the Philippines from 1995 to 1998, and Ambassador to Mexico from 1999 to 2002.

Honours 
: Companion of the Order of St Michael and St George, 1994
: Grand Cross of the Order of Sikatuna, Rank of Datu (24 November 1998)

References

1942 births
Living people
People from Cambridge
People educated at The Leys School
Alumni of Christ's College, Cambridge
Members of HM Diplomatic Service
Ambassadors of the United Kingdom to the Philippines
Ambassadors of the United Kingdom to Mexico
Companions of the Order of St Michael and St George
20th-century British diplomats